Bernard Esterhuizen (born 4 October 1992) is a South African track cyclist. At the 2012 Summer Olympics, he competed in the Men's sprint.

References

South African male cyclists
1992 births
Living people
Olympic cyclists of South Africa
Cyclists at the 2012 Summer Olympics
South African track cyclists
Cyclists at the 2010 Commonwealth Games
Cyclists at the 2014 Commonwealth Games
Commonwealth Games competitors for South Africa